Abba Pitirim of Porphyry was an Egyptian Christian monastic and saint of the fourth century, and a disciple of Anthony the Great. His feast day is November 29 in the Orthodox Church.

Life 
Pitirim was an abbot of many monks, was the third successor of Anthony the Great in his hermitage, and was said to have received Anthony's virtues. He lived on Mount Porphyry in the Thebaid, which was probably named after its proximity to the Roman quarry of Mons Porphyrites that mined a rare stone by the same name.

Pitirim continued the work of Anthony by instructing Christian monks along the Nile in the Thebaid, and lived with his followers in austere asceticism. It was said of Pitirim that he only ate water mixed with a little bit of flour twice a week, and that sometimes he would fast from food entirely.

Pitirim passed away peacefully in the late fourth or early fifth century.

Meeting with Isidora 

A story of Pitirim is related in chapter 34 of Palladius' Lausaic History (written 419-420). According to Palladius, Pitirim one day received a vision from an angel while praying in the mountains.Now an angel appeared to the holy Pitirim, an anchorite of high reputation who dwelt in Porphyrites, and said to him: "Why are you proud of yourself for being religious and dwelling in a place like this? Do you want to see a woman who is more religious than you?"The angel told him to visit the monastery at Tabennisi (founded by Pachomius the Great), and there to find a woman who was more holy than himself. Pitirim did so and met Isidora, a woman of extreme humility among her fellow nuns. Pitirim admonished the other nuns for treating Isidora unkindly.They were all amazed and said to him: "Father, do not let her insult you, she is dumb." Said Pitirim to them all: "You are dumb. For she is am Amma both of me and you."

Verses

Troparion on Tone 8

Ode 6

Hymn of Praise 
From the Prologue of Ohrid by Saint Nikolaj Velimirović.

Teachings 
 Pitirim taught that to each person's passions there are corresponding demons which incite that passion in the person through different temptations. To escape from these demons and from evil thoughts, one must first free the heart from passions.
 Monks often told Pitirim of visions of demons appearing to them. He would say, "I am most afraid of demons, which nest pride, avarice, sensuality and other similar passions. These are the most dangerous demons and great care must be taken towards them."

See also 
 Desert Fathers
 Saint Isidora
 Anthony the Great
 Christian monasticism
 Serapion of Nitria (also a disciple of Anthony)

References 

Eastern Orthodox saints
4th-century Christian monks
4th-century births
Egyptian Christian monks
Saints from Roman Egypt
Coptic Orthodox saints